Philodoppides of Messenia (Philodoppidēs ho Messēnios;  –  BC) was a lyric poet from Messenia, located in the southern Peloponnese in Greece. His poetry survives in fragmentary form, and few biographical details are known.

Biography
Little is known about the life of Philodoppides. When cited by Classical or Hellenistic authors, his works tend to be compared to those produced by the canonical Nine Lyric Poets, most commonly to Alcman and Stesichorus. As a result, most scholars believe that Philodoppides was active during the 7th century B.C. although some have argued for a date as late as the late 6th century B.C. It is difficult to characterise Philodoppides' genre: although he seems to have primarily produced short Greek lyric poetry, his Heleneis (which seems to have been his most significant work) was a relatively short work in the epic genre, taking its themes from Homeric epic poetry.

Poetry
Philodoppides is believed to have written a Heleneis (an account of the fall and subsequent pillage of Troy, written from Helen's perspective); otherwise, he seems to have written primarily on lyric themes such as love poetry. The Heleneis was known to Callimachus, and recorded in an entry of the Pinakes (Callimachus frr. 439-40 Pfeiffer); however, none of the poem itself survives from antiquity. An example of Philodoppides' works in fragmentary form is the following:

By the Hellenistic Period, Philodoppides was considered an inferior lyric poet by the Alexandrian scholars Aristophanes of Byzantium and Aristarchus of Samothrace, who excluded him from their canonical nine.

Philodoppides' works are sometimes referenced in the Scholia to Homeric epic:

Furthermore, it seems that the project of writing epic poetry from Helen's perspective was considered immoral by the Roman Imperial period: the Suda preserves a reference to τὰ πονηρὰ μέλη τοῦ Φιλοδοππίδου περὶ τῆς Ἑλένης ('the immoral verses of Philodoppides concerning Helen'), which it attributes to Philostratus. However, it has been argued that Quintus Smyrnaeus drew inspiration from Philodoppides in his Posthomerica, book 13 of which describes the sack of Troy and the recapture of Helen. This implies that Philodoppides was not exclusively seen as an immoral and inferior poet in the Imperial period.

Philodoppides' work was barely known by the early Renaissance: Martin of Arles suggests that the Heleneis depicted an example of innominabile malum maleficae nominatae quae in antiquis aevis non solum vivebant sed etiam florescebant ('the unnameable evil of those witches by name, who not only lived but actually thrived in the ancient world'). However, given that Philodoppides' poetry had already fallen into disfavour by the Hellenistic period, it is widely considered unlikely that any of his poetry survived as late as the Renaissance: only the title of the Heleneis would have been known by this point.

References

Sources
 .
 .
 .
 .
 .
 .

Ionic Greek poets
620s BC deaths
700s BC births 
6th-century BC Greek people
6th-century BC poets
Ancient Messenians